Schalks or Schalks Station is an unincorporated community located within Plainsboro Township in Middlesex County, New Jersey, United States. Located along Schalks Crossing Road (County Route 683) at its junction with the Northeast Corridor railroad tracks, the area contains single-family homes, forested areas, a former research nuclear reactor built by Industrial Reactor Laboratories, and the rear yards to offices within the Princeton Forrestal Center.

References

Plainsboro Township, New Jersey
Unincorporated communities in Middlesex County, New Jersey
Unincorporated communities in New Jersey